The Soul of Guilda Lois is a 1919 British silent drama film directed by Frank Wilson and starring Violet Hopson, Basil Gill and Cameron Carr. It is based on a novel by Newman Flower and is often known by the alternative title of A Soul's Crucifixion.

Cast
 Violet Hopson as Guilda Lois 
 Basil Gill as Julian Neave 
 Cameron Carr as Paul Brian 
 Richard Buttery as Dicky Tremayne 
 Clifford Pembroke as Major Hardene 
 J. Hastings Batson as Gregoire 
 Hilda Bayley

References

Bibliography
 Low, Rachael. History of the British Film, 1918-1929. George Allen & Unwin, 1971.

External links

1919 films
1919 drama films
British silent feature films
British drama films
Films directed by Frank Wilson
Films based on British novels
British black-and-white films
1910s English-language films
1910s British films
Silent drama films